Jan Kališ (7 July 1930 – 23 July 2003) was a Czech cinematographer and pedagogue. He studied cinematography at FAMU. He worked at Studio of children films (1954–1955) and then at Barrandov Studios (1955–1990). He was teaching cinematography at FAMU from 1965 to 2003. He often worked with directors Zbyněk Brynych and Jindřich Polák. Since 1960s he also worked on productions for West German televisions.

Selected filmography
 Občan Brych (1953)
 Ikarie XB-1 (1963)
 The Fifth Horseman Is Fear (1964)
 Case for a Rookie Hangman (1969)
 Tomorrow I'll Wake Up and Scald Myself with Tea (1977)

References

External links
 

1930 births
2003 deaths
Czech cinematographers
Film people from Brno
Academy of Performing Arts in Prague alumni
Academic staff of the Academy of Performing Arts in Prague